Cobra was a steel inverted roller coaster at the Tivoli Friheden amusement park in Denmark.

Incidents

On July 4, 2008, 6 days after the official opening of the ride, the front cart fell off the rails and fell to the ground, hurting 4 people. After repairs and testing following the incident, the ride was closed until late May 2009.

On July 14, 2022, fourteen years after the first incident, a 14-year old girl was killed while riding the Cobra, after the hindmost cart of the ride broke off and was hanging from the rest of the roller coaster. A 13-year-old boy was also injured. This incident resulted in the closure of the park for two days, and a police investigation is, as of July 2022, ongoing to determine the cause. The ride has also permanently ceased operation due to the incident.

Notes

External links
 Official Page
 RTE ride's page – includes a 3D video

Roller coasters in Denmark
Roller coasters introduced in 2008